Carroll County Airport  is a county-owned public-use airport in Carroll County, Tennessee, United States. It is located four nautical miles (4.6 mi, 7.4 km) northwest of the central business district of Huntingdon, Tennessee. The airport is included in the FAA's National Plan of Integrated Airport Systems for 2011–2015, which categorized it as a general aviation facility.

Although many U.S. airports use the same three-letter location identifier for the FAA and IATA, this facility is assigned HZD by the FAA but has no designation from the IATA.

Facilities and aircraft 
It has one runway designated 1/19 with an asphalt surface measuring 5,507 by 100 feet (1,679 x 30 m).

For the 12-month period ending June 18, 2009, the airport had 12,290 aircraft operations, an average of 33 per day: 99.6% general aviation and 0.4% air taxi. At that time there were 21 single-engine aircraft based at this airport.

References

External links 
 Carroll County (HZD) from Tennessee DOT Airport Directory
 Aerial photo as of 15 February 1997 from USGS The National Map
 
 

Airports in Tennessee
Buildings and structures in Carroll County, Tennessee
Transportation in Carroll County, Tennessee